The Court of Aldermen forms part of the senior governance of the City of London Corporation. It comprises twenty-five aldermen of the City of London, presided over by the Lord Mayor (becoming senior alderman during his year of office). The Court was originally responsible for the entire administration of the City, but most of its responsibilities were subsumed by the Court of Common Council in the fourteenth century. The Court of Aldermen meets nine times a year in the Aldermen's Court Room at Guildhall. The few remaining duties of the Court include approving people for Freedom of the City and approving the formation of new livery companies, appointing the Recorder of London and acting as the Verderers of Epping Forest.

Term of office 
Although there is no compulsion by law to do so, 
Aldermen usually submit themselves for re-election every six years and by custom retire at the age of 70.  In 2020 David Graves declined to stand for re-election after six years as Alderman for Cripplegate, stating “given the current CV-19 concerns and limitations, I decided that to trigger a 42 ... day electoral process now would be inappropriate and unsuitable for the good conduct of a fair election.”  He again deferred standing for re-election in 2021 for the same reason, triggering calls for the reform of the law relating to this election.

List of current aldermen

See also 
 Alderman
 Wards of the City of London

References 

Politics of the City of London
City of London Corporation